Armenians in Israel and Palestine make up a community of approximately 5,000–6,000 Armenians living in both Israel and the State of Palestine.

In 1986, it was estimated that 1,500 Armenians lived in the city of Jerusalem. According to a 2006 survey, 790 Armenians lived in Jerusalem's Old City. In 2021, an estimate of approximately 5,000–6,000 Armenians lived across Israel and Palestine.

History
A significant minority of the Armenian community has been resident in the Levant for centuries.

Classical-era
Recorded Armenian presence in Israel dates back to the 1st century BCE, when the Armenian king Tigranes the Great made much of Judea a vassal of the Kingdom of Armenia.

4th-18th century
The first recorded Armenian pilgrimage to the Holy Land was an Armenian delegation of priests in the early 4th century AD. The visit is alluded to in an Armenian translation of a Greek letter written by Patriarch Macarius of Jerusalem to his contemporary, St. Vrtanes (ruled 333–341).

The Armenian Patriarchate of Jerusalem was founded in 638. It is located in the Armenian Quarter, the smallest quarter of the Old City of Jerusalem.

Ottoman and British periods

Photographers
Starting in the 1850s Armenians became dominant among Palestine's photographers. The central figure in this development was the leading cleric Esayee Garabedian, who were to become Armenian Patriarch of Jerusalem in 1864–65, and who started photographing in 1857 and established a photography workshop within the St. James monastic compound. There he set up a school for photography, Garabed Krikorian (1847-1920) and his brother Kevork counting among his students. Other 19th-century Armenian photographers from Jerusalem are J. H. Halladjian, M. Mardikian and Yusuf Toumaian. After the Armenian genocide other photographers joined them, including Hrnat Nakashian and Elia Kahvedjian.

Garabed Krikorian opened a photography workshop on Jaffa Road in the 1870s and became himself a teacher, one of his students being Khalil Raad, known as "Palestine's first Arab photographer".

Elia Kahvedjian (1910-1999), a refugee of the Armenian genocide, was one of the leading photographers in Jerusalem at the beginning of the 20th century.

Ceramicists

Many Armenians from Kütahya, a city in Turkey, were known for their hand-painted ceramic wares and tiles. In 1919, several master craftsmen were brought to Jerusalem to renovate the tiles covering the facade of the Dome of the Rock. They remained in Jerusalem and developed the art of Armenian ceramics.

Israeli period

1948-1967
After the 1948 Arab–Israeli War and the establishment of the State of Israel, a number of Armenians residing in what had been the British Mandate of Palestine took up Israeli citizenship, whereas other Armenian residents of Old City of Jerusalem and the territory captured by Jordan received Jordanian nationality.. Two groups of Armenians emerged: Armenians with Israeli citizenship living within the borders of the state and Armenians with Jordanian nationality in Jerusalem's Armenian Quarter and the rest of Jordanian West Bank.

After 1967
After the 1967 Six-Day War, the Armenian population, especially in East Jerusalem and the West Bank, experienced a decrease in its numbers because of emigration. Armenians of Jerusalem were provided with Israeli resident status and some applied for citizenship.

In 1983, tensions arose within the Armenian Quarter of Jerusalem, when Patriarch Yeshighe Derderian replaced Archbishop Shahe Ajamian. Violence erupted in June 1986, when a group of Armenian Patriarch Derderian's supporters attacked another Armenian family, which was well known for its anti-Patriarch views and as a result one man was killed and six others were injured in a street battle that church representatives dubbed "a fight between two families."

Demographics
In 1986, it was estimated that 1,500 Armenians lived in the city of Jerusalem. According to a 2006 survey, 790 Armenians lived in Jerusalem's Old City. In 2022, an estimate of approximately 5,000–6,000 Armenians lived across Israel and Palestine.

There are a few Russian-speaking Jews from Armenia in Israel, but they are classified within the former USSR Aliyah, so no precise statistics are available prior to 1991 when Armenia restored its independence from the USSR.

Religion
The overwhelming majority of Armenians in Israel are Armenian Orthodox Christians, but there are also a small number of Armenian Catholics and Armenian Evangelicals. The Armenian Orthodox remain under the jurisdiction of the Armenian Patriarchate of Jerusalem and the residing Patriarch, in spiritual connection with the Armenian Apostolic Church (See of Holy Etchmiadzin), whereas the Armenian Catholics are under the jurisdiction of the Armenian Catholic Church and Patriarchal Vicar (residing at Via Dolorosa 41 - Fourth Station).

The Churches belonging to the Armenian Apostolic Church are among others St. Elias Church in Haifa and Saint Nicholas Church and Monastery in Jaffa. Armenian-Israelis also pray in St. James Cathedral (Surpotz Hagopyants) at the Armenian Patriarchate of Jerusalem, at the Church of the Holy Sepulchre in Jerusalem (under joint jurisdiction of Armenian Church with other Christian churches), the Tomb of Virgin Mary and Gethsemane, the Chapel of the Ascension on Mount of Olives, the Church of St. Gregory the Enlightener in modern Jerusalem, and the Church of the Nativity in Bethlehem (again under joint jurisdiction of the Armenian Church and other Christian churches). The Armenian Church also has the St George Monastery in Ramle. Armenians in Israel and Palestine celebrate Christmas and the Epiphany on the same day, which is traditionally on January 19, while Armenian Orthodox communities in Armenia and worldwide celebrate on January 6. This is because the Armenian Patriarchate of Jerusalem still abides by the ancient Julian calendar, whereas the Armenian Apostolic Church has adopted the Gregorian calendar. Armenian Catholics, Evangelical and Brethren churches in Israel celebrate Christmas on December 25, in line with all other Catholics of the Roman Catholic Church as well as other fellow Protestants.

Language and culture
The Institute of African and Asian Studies at the Hebrew University of Jerusalem established a chair of Armenian Studies program, specialising in study of Armenian language, literature, history and culture as well as the Armenian genocide.

Armenia–Israel relations

Armenia maintains diplomatic relations with Israel. According to the CIA World Factbook, Armenia receives 4.8% of its imports from Israel, while Israel receives 7.1% of Armenia's exports. Although both countries have diplomatic relations, neither maintains an embassy in the other country. Instead, Ambassador Ehud Moshe Eytam, the Israeli ambassador to Armenia is based in Tbilisi, Georgia, and visits Yerevan twice a month. In Jerusalem Tsolag Momjian is the honorary consul.

Since Armenia's independence, Israeli politicians, rabbis, and the country's Armenian community have called on the Israeli government to recognize the Armenian genocide. At the same time, Turkey has threatened to break off ties with Israel if Israel or the United States recognized the killings as genocide. As of 2008, there has been an ongoing debate regarding recognition in the Knesset with Turkey lobbying hard to prevent it.  A 2007 survey found that more than 70% of Israelis thought that Israel should recognize the genocide, with 44% willing to break off relations with Turkey over the issue.

See also 
 Armenia–Israel relations
 Armenian Quarter, Jerusalem
 History of the Jews in Armenia
 Religion in Israel
 Christianity in Israel

References

External links
Webpage about the Armenian community in Israel
Israel at ArmeniaPedia
Armenian Patriarchate of Jerusalem
Library of Congress (US) website: Photographs taken by Garabed Krikorian (1847-1920) or his son Johannes Krikorian who joined the studio in 1913.

 
Ethnic groups in Israel
 
Early photographers in Palestine
Israel
Ethnic groups in the Middle East